Laughing at Danger may refer to:
 Laughing at Danger (1940 film), an American crime film
 Laughing at Danger (1924 film), an American silent action film